Secret prisons of SBU are secret detention facilities operated by Security Service of Ukraine (SBU) in Eastern Ukraine to incarcerate Russian-backed separatists.

Background
According to multiple reports of UN monitoring mission in Ukraine, Amnesty International and Human Rights Watch the practice of unacknowledged detention is accompanied by widespread torture and various forms of human rights abuses. 
The Ukrainian authorities refuse to acknowledge the existence of the prisons, but the enforced disappearances keep happening when Ukrainian security forces detain people and try to conceal their fate.

Investigative history 
A first evidence of enforced disappearances in Eastern Ukraine committed by the Security Service of Ukraine was reported by the Office of the High Commissioner for Human Rights (OHCHR, United Nations) in August 2014.

In 2015, UN monitoring mission in Ukraine published a testimonies of detainees, who were held incommunicado in secret SBU detention facility located in Kharkiv. The Ukrainian secret service has denied the allegations.

An official report of UN Amnesty International and Human Rights Watch issued in 2016 has presented multiple cases of unlawful, unacknowledged detention in SBU premises in Kharkiv, Izyum, Kramatorsk, and Mariupol. Investigation revealed that Ukrainian pro-government forces, including members of volunteer battalions, held civilian victims in prolonged, secret captivity. Later the detained individuals were handed over to the Security Service of Ukraine. During the incarceration the detainees were tortured, beaten, subjected to electric shocks, threatened with sexual abuse, execution, and retaliation against family members in order to retrieve their confessions. Eventually some of them were transferred into a regular criminal justice system, some other ones were later exchanged for people captured by the rebel forces or released without trial.

By August 2016 the Office of the High Commissioner for Human Rights made a conclusion that "Ukrainian authorities have allowed the deprivation of liberty of individuals in secret for prolonged periods of time".

For example, one of the prisoners, Mykola Vakaruk, spent in the custody more than 600 days, suffering from repeated beatings and freezing cold. As a result of improper conditions he lost a kidney. Being in hospital he was forced to adopt a fake identity before undergoing kidney surgery. Finally he was released with compensation around ₴100 (less than $4).

In 2018, the Human Rights Watch and Amnesty International said that the victims of arbitrary detention in government-controlled secret prisons in Eastern Ukraine continue to face new, serious obstacles to justice.

References

Black sites
Penal system in Ukraine
Black sites
Human rights abuses in Ukraine
2016 in Ukraine
Security Service of Ukraine
Russo-Ukrainian War